Della Money  is a speech and language therapist and Chairperson of the Royal College of Speech and Language Therapists. Money is currently a consultant speech and language therapist with Nottinghamshire Healthcare NHS Trust.

Select publications
Money, D. 1997. "A comparison of three approaches to delivering a speech and language therapy service to people with learning disabilities", European Journal of Disorders of Communication 32 (4),  
Money, D. 1999. "Satisfaction for All: A Framework for Assessing Life Satisfaction for All People with Learning Disabilities", British Journal of Learning Difficulties 27 (2), 52-57. .
Money D. 2015. "Five Good Communication Standards in practice: two years on". RCSLT Bulletin 762, 12-15.

References

External links
Money and Thurman's 2002 Means, Reasons and Opportunities Model

Living people
British women academics
Speech and language pathologists
Year of birth missing (living people)
Fellows of the Royal College of Speech and Language Therapists